Thomas or Tom Horn may refer to:

 Tom Horn (1860–1903), American scout, cowboy, soldier, range detective, and Pinkerton agent
 Tom Horn (film), 1980 Western film
 Thomas E. Horn, president of the San Francisco War Memorial and Performing Arts Center
 Thomas Horn (born 1997), American actor who played Oskar Schell in Extremely Loud & Incredibly Close

See also
Thomas Horne (disambiguation)
Tom Horne (born 1945), Canadian-American attorney and politician